Military commission may refer to:

 A commissioned officer's official document of appointment
 A type of court in military justice or martial law 
 Military commissions in the United States
 Guantanamo military commissions for prosecuting detainees held in the Guantanamo Bay detainment camps.
 Central Military Commission, in communist countries responsible for the ruling party's control of the nation's armed forces

See also
 Commission (disambiguation)